Muhammet Oğuz Zengin, or simply Oğuz Zengin, is a Turkish curler, and member of the Turkey men's national curling team. He is student at Atatürk University in Erzurum and plays in the university team.

At the 2011 European Curling Championships-Group C competition held in  Tårnby Denmark, he was the lead in the team, which won the bronze medal. He skipped his national team to the gold medal at the 2012 European Curling Championships-Group C in Erzurum, Turkey helping his team's promotion to Group B.

Achievements

References

External links
 

Date of birth missing (living people)
Place of birth missing (living people)
Living people
Turkish male curlers
Atatürk University alumni
Year of birth missing (living people)
21st-century Turkish people